Bill Carmody (born 1951) is an American men's college basketball coach

Bill Carmody may also refer to:

 Bill Carmody (footballer, born 1889) (1889–1953), Australian rules footballer for Carlton
 Bill Carmody (footballer, born 1922) (1922–2001), Australian rules footballer for St Kilda
 Bill Carmody (priest) (1957–2016), Catholic priest and anti-abortion activist